Miravalles Protected Zone is a nature reserve in the northwest part of Costa Rica, which forms part of the Arenal Tempisque Conservation Area. The site contains the Miravalles Volcano, which is still active although the last recorded eruption was only of steam vents in 1946.  The zone was created on 16 March 1976 by Executive Decree 5836-A.

On 5 June 2019, Miravalles Jorge Manuel Dengo National Park was created by allocating  from the original   of this zone.

References

External links 
 Miravalles Protected Zone at Costa Rica National Parks

Nature reserves in Costa Rica